Mustafa Jamal al-Din, (Arabic: مصطفى جمال الدين) was an Iraqi Shi'ite scholar, poet, and writer. He was born in Suq Al-Shuyukh and studied in Najaf. He is a Shi'ite faqih and has numerous works of literature, including a collection of poems and a graphic novel. He died in Damascus.

Lineage 
Mustafa ibn Sayyid Mirza Ja'far bin Sayyid Mirza Inayatullah bin Sayyid Mirza Hussein bin Sayyid Mirza Ali bin Sayyid Mirza Abu Ahmed Mohammed bin Abd Al-Nabi Al-Akhbari, who is known as Mirza Jamaluddin. Jamal al-Din’s family was named Al Jamaluddin after their great grandfather, Sayyid Mohammed, who was known as Jamaluddin because he was a great scholar of his time and was knowledgeable in the sciences of religion. Al Jamaluddin family is a well-known scientific and religious family in and outside of Iraq, and from which many scholars and writers have graduated. The lineage of this family is related to the nephew of Prophet Muhammad, the Caliph Ali ibn Abi Talib, through Musa al-Mubarraqa, Muhammad Al-Jawad’s son. Jamal al-Din was born in a village in Suq Al-Shuyukh, Nasiriyah province, southern Iraq.

Education 
He studied in a Quran school in his hometown, then moved to Karmat Bani Saeed to continue primary school. He completed fourth grade then moved to Najaf to study religious sciences. He completed the first two levels of studying Muqad'dim'maat and Sotooh then moved to Bahath Kharij level. He then went on to attend halaqah of Grand Ayatollah Sayyid Abu al-Qasim al-Musawi al-Khoei, and was known between his colleagues for his intelligence, writing his professor's reports on jurisprudence and origins. He was appointed teaching assistant at the faculty of jurisprudence in Najaf for ranking first in his class, and that was in 1962. In 1969 he enrolled for a master’s degree at the University of Baghdad. After three years of research and studying, he obtained his master’s degree with a very good grade. In 1972, he was appointed professor at the faculty of arts of the University of Baghdad and became known in Iraq and the Arab world. He later received a PhD with excellent grades from the department of Arabic in 1979.

Jamal al-Din the writer 
Jamal al-Din was a great poet, educated by a well-known religious family. He started writing poetry in middle school, and when he entered college poetry came easy to him. His Hawza studies combined with his passion for poetry gave him the chance to get to know contemporary Iraqi poets, such as al-Sayyab, Al-Bayati, Al-Jawahiri, Nazik al-Malaika, and others. As for his poetry, it has a unique feature that distinguishes his works, which is combining patriotism with love. He had humanitarian initiatives, in which he discusses life, speaking about it using poetry. Poet Faleh Al-Kilani says in his book on literature and the arts that Jamal al-Din is one of the greatest modern Najafi poets, and that this is what he had once said about earning money for writing poetry: “I have been around kings, rulers, presidents, and devotees of Iraq and have never complimented any of them.”

Works 
He has several literary, doctrinal and political works, including:

 Analogy: Truth and Justification - “Master’s thesis” (original: Qiyas: ḥaqyqth wā ḥuǧyth)
 Juristic Discretion: Truth and Meaning (original: Istihsan: ḥaqyqth wā mʿnāh)
 The Grammar Research of the Fundamentalists - “PhD thesis” (original: ālbḥṯ ālnḥwy ʿnd ālōṣwlyyn)
 Rhythm in Arabic Poetry: Verse to Foot (original: al-Īqāʻ fī al-shiʻr al-ʻArabī min al-bayt ilá al-tafʻīlah)
 “Baghdad” (poem)
 Arabs of the Marshlands Predicament and Arab Silence (original: Miḥnat al-ahwār wa-al-ṣamt al-ʻArabī)

He also has several poetry collections, including:

 Your Eyes and The Old Melody (original: ʻAynāki wa-al-Lahn al-qadīm)
 al-Diwan

References 

Muslim poets
University of Baghdad alumni
Muslim writers
Iraqi scholars
Iraqi writers
21st-century Iraqi writers
21st-century Arabic writers
21st-century Arabic poets
Iraqi emigrants to Syria
1926 births
1996 deaths
20th-century Iraqi poets